Nijkerkerveen is a village in the Dutch province of Gelderland. It is a part of the municipality of Nijkerk, and lies about 6 km east of Amersfoort.

It was first mentioned in 1807 as Nieuwkerker Vheen, and means "bog near Nijkerk". In 1840, it was home to 1,197 people. In 1908, the first church was built.

References

External links

  Nijkerkerveen is het Hart van Nijkerk

Populated places in Gelderland
Nijkerk